The Al-Rahman Mosque is a mosque in Kuala Lumpur, Malaysia. The mosque is located at University of Malaya in Jalan Pantai Baharu and was named after the first Malaysian Prime Minister, Tunku Abdul Rahman Putra Al-Haj. Today, the mosque is joint managed by University of Malaya and the Department of Federal Territory Islamic Affairs (JAWI).

History
The foundation stone of the mosque was laid down by the first Malaysian Prime Minister, Almarhum Tunku Abdul Rahman Putra Al-Haj on 6 November 1962. Construction of this mosque took about a year to complete with a total expenditure of about RM 400,000 (a the large number at that point).

On 23 August 1963, the mosque was officially opened by the third Yang di-Pertuan Agong, Almarhum Tuanku Syed Putra Jamalullail of Perlis.

In 2010, the mosque started hosting a methadone programme combined with praying to treat drug addicts. The methadone is dispensed through pharmacists by the Ministry of Health, while doctors from the University of Malaya supervise the patients. The spiritual side of the treatment is thought to help prevent relapse.

See also
 Islam in Malaysia

References

Mosques in Kuala Lumpur
Mosques completed in 1963
1963 establishments in Malaysia